These are some of the notable events relating to politics in 2012.

Events

February
The Singaporean by-election was held

March
The Toi by-election was held in Niue.

April
The World Bank presidential election was won by Jim Yong Kim.

June
The United Nations General Assembly presidential election was held.

October
The United Nations Security Council election was held.

November
Xi Jinping succeeded Hu Jintao as General Secretary of the Chinese Communist Party and became the paramount leader of China in November 2012.

Deaths

January
Manuel Fraga Iribarne, Spanish politician (born 1922)
Oscar Luigi Scalfaro, 9th President of Italy (born 1918)

March
Francisco Xavier do Amaral, 1st President of East Timor (born 1937)
Ċensu Tabone, 4th President of Malta (born 1913)
George Tupou V, King of Tonga (born 1948)

April
Miguel de la Madrid, 52nd President of Mexico (born 1934)
Ahmed Ben Bella, 1st President of Algeria (born 1918)

May
May 11 - Alfred Diamant, American political scientist and academic (born 1917)

Elections
6 November - Democrat Barack Obama is re-elected president of the United States.
Local electoral calendar 2012
National electoral calendar 2012
Supranational electoral calendar 2012

See also
List of foreign ministers in 2012

References 

 
Politics by year
21st century in politics
2010s in politics